Apaustus is a genus of skippers in the family Hesperiidae.

Species
Recognised species in the genus Apaustus include:
 Apaustus menes (Stoll, 1782)

Former species
Apaustus anomoeus Plötz, 1879 - transferred to Astictopterus anomoeus (Plötz, 1879)
Apaustus argyrosticta Plötz, 1879 - transferred to Argemma argyrosticta (Plötz, 1879)
Apaustus debilis Plötz, 1879 - transferred to Prosopalpus debilis (Plötz, 1879)
Apaustus facilis Plötz, 1884 - transferred to Eutocus facilis (Plötz, 1884)
Apaustus ira Butler, 1870 - transferred to Rigga ira (Butler, 1870)
Apaustus valerius Möschler, 1879 - transferred to Cobalopsis valerius (Möschler, 1879)
Apaustus vicinus Plötz, 1884 - transferred to Lento vicinus (Plötz, 1884)

References

Natural History Museum Lepidoptera genus database

Hesperiinae
Hesperiidae genera